Michael Kofman is an American military analyst known for his expertise on the Russian Armed Forces. He is the director of the Russia Studies Program at CNA, fellow of the Center for a New American Security, and until 2021 was a fellow of the Kennan Institute at the Wilson Center.

Early life and education
Kofman was born in Kyiv, Ukrainian SSR, Soviet Union, and lived in Mykolaiv before immigrating to the U.S. in early 1991, prior to Ukrainian independence and the collapse of the Soviet Union. Kofman speaks fluent Russian as well as English. He attained a Bachelor of Arts degree in political science at Northeastern University, and a Master of Arts degree in international security at the Edmund A. Walsh School of Foreign Service at Georgetown University.

Career 
From 2005 to 2006, Kofman was a researcher at the United States Institute of Peace. From 2008 to 2014, he was as a research fellow at the National Defense University. He served as a program manager and subject matter expert, advising U.S. government and military officials on matters related to Russia and Eurasia. From 2014 to 2021, he was a fellow of the Kennan Institute at the Woodrow Wilson International Center for Scholars, an U.S. think tank dedicated to the study of Russia and other post-Soviet states.

In 2015, Kofman joined the CNA Corporation as a research scientist. His research focused on Russia and the former Soviet Union, and he specializes in the Russian Armed Forces and Russian military thought, capabilities, and strategy. As of 2022, he serves as the Research Program Director of the CNA's Russia Studies Program. He was also a fellow at the Modern War Institute from 2017 to 2018, and has been a senior adjunct fellow at the Center for a New American Security since 2021.

2022 Russian invasion of Ukraine 
Kofman was convinced Russia would invade and Ukraine would be defeated. Writing three days before the invasion in Foreign Affairs, Kofman and Edmonds predicted ‘Russia’s Shock and Awe: Why Moscow Would Use Overwhelming Force Against Ukraine.’
During the Russian invasion of Ukraine in 2022, Kofman emerged as a leading expert of the war and of Russia's armed forces. Throughout the war, he has been critical of the effectiveness of the Russian military in their invasion of Ukraine. In an interview with The New Yorker, Kofman said that the Russian military was "deeply optimistic about their ability to quickly get into the capital and force Zelensky to either flee or surrender. So the initial operation is a complete debacle. It was based entirely on political assumptions in Moscow that basically nothing had changed in Ukraine since 2014, and that they could conduct a slightly larger version of the 2014 operation." He has said that the Russian military was "not built for this war. In terms of manpower, readiness, and logistics, it was not designed to sustain strategic ground offensives or hold large tracts of terrain, especially in a country the size of [Ukraine]." Speaking at an event hosted by RUSI, Kofman said that while the logistics problems with the Russian military's offensive are "oversold", that they will nevertheless become "extremely hard to undo ... militaries often have to learn problems the hard way."

Personal life
Kofman lives in Alexandria, Virginia.

References

External links 
 Russian Military Analysis - Michael Kofman's personal blog

American military writers
Year of birth missing (living people)
Living people
Ukrainian SSR emigrants to the United States
People from Mykolaiv
People from Alexandria, Virginia